Zhoneti Hydro Power Plant is proposed  large power plant in village  , Georgia with two turbines having a nominal capacity of 55 MW each for a total capacity of 110 MW.

See also

 List of power stations in Georgia (country)
 Energy in Georgia (country)

References

Hydroelectric power stations in Georgia (country)
Proposed hydroelectric power stations
Proposed renewable energy power stations in Georgia (country)